Mansehra District is a district in Hazara Division of Khyber Pakhtunkhwa province in Pakistan.

It was established as a district in 1976, prior to which it was a tehsil within the former Hazara District. Two former subdivisions of Mansehra were split off into separate districts: Battagram in 1993, and Torghar District (formerly known as Kala Dhaka) in 2011.

Demographics
At the time of the 2017 census the district had a population of 1,555,742, of which 771,976 were males and 783,509 females. Rural population was 1,410,844 (90.69%) while the urban population was 144,898 (9.31%). The literacy rate was 62.56% - the male literacy rate was 75.25% while the female literacy rate was 50.41%. 427 people in the district were from religious minorities.

At the time of the 2017 census, 66.48% of the population spoke Hindko and 17.02% Pashto as their first language. 14.26% of the population spoke a language recorded as 'Others' on the census.

Many of these, especially in the upper Kaghan Valley, are speakers of Kohistani dialects. There are also speakers of the widely dispersed Gujari language, particularly in the Kaghan Valley. The local variety is intermediate between the eastern dialects of Gujari (spoken in Azad Kashmir) and the western group (from Chitral, Swat and Gilgit). There is also a small community in the village of Dana in Oghi Tehsil who speak the endangered Mankiyali language.  Many people can write and speak English.

Constituencies
The district is represented in the Khyber Pakhtunkhwa Assembly by elected MPAs who represent the following constituencies:

Constituency PK-30 (Mansehra-I)
Constituency PK-31 (Manshera-II)
PK 32
PK 33
PK 34

The district is represented in the National Assembly of Pakistan by two elected MNAs who represent the following constituencies:

NA-13 (Mansehra-I)
NA-14 (Mansehra Torghar)

Administrative divisions

Mansehra District consists of six tehsils, with Tanawal Tehsil separated from the other five in December 2022.
 Balakot
 Mansehra
 Oghi
 Baffa Pakhal 
 Darband
 Tanawal

The Kala Dhaka tehsil was separated as Torghar District in 2011.

Mansehra
Mansehra Tehsil union councils:

Provincial Assembly

Notable people 

 Mahan Singh Mirpuri (famous Sikh Khalsa Army General, Mansehra derives its name from him)
 Abdul Hakeem Khan Swati(Governor KPK)
 Muhammad Farid Khan Tanoli ( Nawab of Amb state)
 Waji-Uz-Zaman Khan( Chief of Swati )
 Abdul Karim Saeed Pasha
 Abrar Ahmed Swati (Pakistani Cricketer)
 Ahmed Hussain Shah
 Azam Khan Swati (Senator and Federal Minister of Pakistan)
 Babar Saleem Swati (MPA)
 Reham Khan Swati (BBC Journalist)
 Bashir Jehangiri Swati ( Chief Justice of Pakistan)
 Chaudhry Aslam Khan
 Laiq Muhammad Swati (MPA)
 Ghulam Ghaus Hazarvi
 Ghulam Ur Rehman
 Haroon Khan Badshah
 Ibrar Hussain
 Jamal J. Elias
 Maliha Ali Asghar Khan
 Mian Zia ur Rehman
 Muhammad Raza Khan
 Muhammad Safdar Awan
 Muhammad Sajjad Awan
 Muneeb-ur-Rehman
 Qari Fayyaz-ur-Rehman Alvi
 Saleh Muhammad Khan Swati (MNA)
 Sardar Muhammad Yousuf
 Sardar Shahjahan Yousuf
 Sardar Zahoor Ahmad
 Khan Khudadad Khan Swati( Ex-Minister of health West Pakistan)

See also
 Mansehra Shiva Temple
 Mansehra Tehsil

References

Bibliography

 
Districts of Khyber Pakhtunkhwa